Natalya Pechonkina (maiden name Burda, later Chistyakova,; born July 15, 1946) is a Soviet athlete who competed mainly in the 400 metres.

Under maiden name Burda, she began athletics in Saratov, coached by B.Kolokolov. She received the title Master of Sports of the USSR, International Class in 1967 and competed for the USSR in the 1968 Summer Olympics held in Mexico City in the 400 metres where she won the bronze medal.

She is the mother of pole vaulter Viktor Chistiakov and the grandmother of Australian pole vaulters Liz Parnov and Vicky Parnov.

External links
 Profile at sporting-heroes.net

1946 births
Russian female sprinters
Soviet female sprinters
Olympic bronze medalists for the Soviet Union
Athletes (track and field) at the 1968 Summer Olympics
Athletes (track and field) at the 1972 Summer Olympics
Olympic athletes of the Soviet Union
Living people
Medalists at the 1968 Summer Olympics
Olympic bronze medalists in athletics (track and field)
Olympic female sprinters